Julien Franck Bouadjie Kamgang (born 2 May 1996 in Marseille), better known as Tayc (pronounced Ta-ick - similar to <like> but with a t), is a Cameroonian-French singer and songwriter. Prior to the release of his triple album titled Nyxia (2019), he released two mixtapes and a number of singles. His second album called Fleur froide (2020) hit the charts which launched his international career. Tayc's latest release is called Fleur froide - Second état : la cristallisation (2021) accounts for various new singles as well as previous one from Fleur Froide.

Career
Born in Marseille to Cameroonian parents, Bouadjie launched his musical career in 2012 after relocating to Paris. He studied theatre and dance before moving to song and writing. His first release was a10-track mixtape, Alchemy on 30 May 2017 followed by a second mixtape H.E.L.I.O.S on 27 July 2018.

Signing with the label H24 founded by Barack Adama of Sexion D'assaut, he worked on his debut studio album. In February 2019, Tayc released debut album NYXIA which reissued two more times with, the Tome II on 21 June 2019 Tome III on 13 December 2019 all under the title Nyxia. Tome II particularly concentrated on his Cameroonian roots. He featured songs from his triple album with a big concert in Trianon de Paris on 19 October 2019.

Discography

Albums

Mixtapes

Singles

Songs featured in

Other charting songs

Collaborations
2018: "Dana" (feat Rawdolff) 
2019: "Tu mens" (Dj Leska feat. Barack Adama, Tayc)
2019: "Poison ou antidote" (Dadju feat. Tayc)
2019: "Trip" (Lefa feat. Tayc)
2019: "Ewondo ou Bami" (feat Manu Dibango)
2020: "Libertad" (Chapitre 2) (Barack Adama feat. Tayc) 
2020: "Mon Histoire - Part 1" (Abou Debeing feat. Tayc)
2020: "Meilleurs" (Abou Debeing feat. Tayc)
2020: "Cocktail" (DJ R'AN feat. Tayc)
2020: "Cocktail Remix" (DJ R'AN feat. Tayc)
2020: "Mes défauts (Barack Adama feat. Lefa)
2020: "Melody" (Gracy Hopkins feat. Tayc)
2020: "Pour nous" (Vegedream feat. Tayc)
2020: "Je Wanda" (Dinos feat. Tayc)

Awards and nominations

References

French male singers
Living people
Musicians from Marseille
1996 births